Indolestes alleni is a species of damselfly in the family Lestidae,
commonly known as a small reedling. 
It is found across northern Australia where it inhabits lagoons, ponds and swamps.

Indolestes alleni is a medium-sized, dull-coloured damselfly. The male superior anal appendages are forcipate.

Gallery

See also
 List of Odonata species of Australia

References 

Lestidae
Odonata of Australia
Insects of Australia
Endemic fauna of Australia
Taxa named by Robert John Tillyard
Insects described in 1913
Damselflies